Adult Contemporary is a chart published by Billboard ranking the top-performing songs in the United States in the adult contemporary music (AC) market.  In 1987, 22 songs topped the chart, then published under the title Hot Adult Contemporary, based on playlists submitted by radio stations.

In the year's first issue of Billboard the number one song was "Love Is Forever" by Billy Ocean, which was in its third week at number one.  It held the top spot for a single week in 1987 before being replaced by "This Is the Time" by Billy Joel.  The third chart-topper of the year, "At This Moment" by Billy Vera and the Beaters, had originally been released in 1981 but met with little success.  Several years later, however, it was used in the NBC sitcom Family Ties to soundtrack the romance between Alex P. Keaton and his girlfriend Ellen Reed, after which it was re-released and became a hit, topping both the AC chart and Billboards all-genre listing, the Hot 100.  A second song to top the AC chart in 1987 based on exposure on television was "Moonlighting", the theme song from the comedy-drama of the same name which aired on ABC.  Performed by Al Jarreau, the song topped the chart for a single week in July.  Two songs featured in films also topped the chart in 1987: "Nothing's Gonna Stop Us Now" by Starship from the soundtrack of Mannequin, and "(I've Had) The Time of My Life" by Bill Medley and Jennifer Warnes from Dirty Dancing.

"(I've Had) The Time of My Life" was one of three songs to tie for the longest unbroken run at number one during the year with four weeks in the top spot, along with "Ballerina Girl" by Lionel Richie and "Little Lies" by Fleetwood Mac.  Only two acts achieved more than one AC number one in 1987.  Whitney Houston topped the chart with "I Wanna Dance with Somebody (Who Loves Me)" in July and "Didn't We Almost Have It All" in September, and Steve Winwood reached number one with "The Finer Things" in April and "Back in the High Life Again" in August.  All four songs spent three weeks at number one, and Houston and Winwood tied for the highest total number of weeks at number one by an act in 1987 with six apiece.  The final number one of the year was "Got My Mind Set on You" by George Harrison.  The song, which also topped the Hot 100, was the last Billboard number one achieved by any of the former members of the Beatles.

Chart history

References

See also
1987 in music
List of artists who reached number one on the U.S. Adult Contemporary chart

1987
1987 record charts
1987 in American music